The Anderson–Frank House (also known as the James Buchannan Anderson House) is a historic home in Tampa, Florida, United States. It is located at 341 Plant Avenue. On April 22, 1982, it was added to the U.S. National Register of Historic Places. The architects credited with designing the house are Francis J. Kennard and Michael J. Miller.

The house was built for James B. Anderson during 1898–1901.  It is a two-and-a-half-story house which was deemed "significant as one of the best examples of Colonial Revival style architecture in Tampa, Florida. ...[T]he house is a masterly example of Colonial Revival design, subtly combining materials, textures, and patterns in a free but harmonic relationship to each other."  The house's asymmetrical design and a wraparound porch are elements of Queen Anne style architecture in the United States.

Gallery

References

External links
 Hillsborough County listings at National Register of Historic Places
 Hillsborough County listings at Florida's Office of Cultural and Historical Programs
 Sape A. Zylstra Architectural Slides Collection at USF Libraries Digital Collections

Houses in Tampa, Florida
Houses on the National Register of Historic Places in Hillsborough County, Florida
National Register of Historic Places in Tampa, Florida
Houses completed in 1898
1898 establishments in Florida